Kogula is a village in Saaremaa Parish, Saare County in western Estonia.

Before the administrative reform in 2017, the village was in Lääne-Saare Parish.

Mullutu Bay, the western part of Estonian fourth largest lake Mullutu-Suurlaht, is partially located in the southeastern end of the territory of Kogula village.

References

Villages in Saare County